Hum Dono may refer to:

 Hum Dono (1961 film) starring Dev Anand
 Hum Dono (1985 film) starring Rajesh Khanna
 Hum Dono (1995 film)
 Hum Dono (TV series), a Hindi songs countdown show which follows a story of two people
 Hum Dono (1969), the title of a recording by the Joe Harriott Amancio D'Silva Quartet